Walter Robertson Taliaferro (September 9, 1880 – October 11, 1915) was a pioneer aviator in the U.S. Army who died in a flying accident. After his first and last "loop the loop" in a Curtiss tractor biplane, the plane suddenly dove into San Diego Bay, killing him instantly.

Biography
Taliaferro was born on September 9, 1880, in Campbell County, Kentucky. He served as an enlisted man in the artillery for seven years before being commissioned as an officer in the 21st infantry in 1908. He did surveying work in the Philippine Islands and in 1913 was detailed to the Aeronautical Division, U.S. Signal Corps, for pilot training.

Taliaferro was married to Leicester Sehon (1894-1918), the daughter of San Diego mayor John L. Sehon. He died on October 11, 1915, in San Diego. He was buried in San Diego at the Mount Hope Cemetery.

Camp Taliaferro in Texas was named in his honor, as was Camp Taliaferro in San Diego.

Records
Taliaferro made an aviation distance record, flying 220 miles in about 3.5 hours. With Lieutenant Joseph E. Carberry, he set a new American altitude record for a plane carrying two persons of about 7,000 feet, although it was only a month until Carberry and another reached 11,690 feet. Taliaferro also achieved a flight endurance record in September 1915 of 9 hours and 45 minutes, before he ran out of fuel.

References

 Arnold, History of Rockwell Field, 39, 50–51. quoted in Wallace R. Peck Forgotten Air Pioneers: The Army’s Rockwell Field at North Island in The Journal of San Diego History retrieved July 4, 2009.

External links
Early Aviators: Walter R. Taliaferro (1880–1915)

1880 births
1915 deaths
Aviators killed in aviation accidents or incidents in the United States
United States Army officers
Accidental deaths in California
Burials at Mount Hope Cemetery (San Diego)
Flight endurance record holders
American aviation record holders